Derek Sullivan may refer to:

 Derrick Sullivan (1930–1983), Welsh footballer
 Derek Sullivan (artist) (born 1976), Canadian artist